Spinidrupa aethes is a species of sea snail, a marine gastropod mollusk, in the family Muricidae, the murex snails or rock snails.

Descreiption
The length of the shell attains 19.8 mm.

Distribution
This marine species occurs in Papua New Guinea.

References

aethes
Gastropods described in 2017